Bagrat of Tao may refer to:

 Bagrat I of Tao (died 945), Georgian prince and son of Adarnase IV
 Bagrat II of Tao (died 966), Georgian prince and son of Adarnase II Kuropalates